Vasilka Rafailova Stoeva (born 14 January 1940 in Kotel, Sliven) is a Bulgarian athlete who competed mainly in the women's discus throw event during her career.

She competed for Bulgaria at the 1972 Summer Olympics held in Munich, Germany where she won the bronze medal in the women's discus throw event.

References
 profile
 sports-reference

1940 births
Living people
Bulgarian female discus throwers
Olympic bronze medalists for Bulgaria
Athletes (track and field) at the 1972 Summer Olympics
Olympic athletes of Bulgaria
Medalists at the 1972 Summer Olympics
Olympic bronze medalists in athletics (track and field)
People from Kotel, Bulgaria